Valle de Güímar is a Spanish Denominación de Origen Protegida (DOP) for wines located along the south-eastern coastline of Tenerife (Canary Islands, Spain), and acquired its DO in 1996.

Geography
The vines are grown on the southern slopes of the Teide, a volcano, making it one of the highest winegrowing areas in Europe, between 175 m and 1,500 m above sea-level.

Soils
There are three types of soil in the DOP: the lower altitude soils are sandy, the middle reaches are pumice-based and the higher slopes are clay.

Climate
The climate in southern Tenerife is mild and temperate, with influence from the trade winds.

Authorised grape varieties
The authorised grape varieties are:
 Red: Castellana Negra, Listán Negro / Almuñeco, Malvasía Rosada, Negramoll / Mulata, Tintilla, Bastardo Tinto / Baboso Negro, Cabernet Sauvignon, Listán Prieto, Merlot, Moscatel Negro, Pinot Noir, Ruby Cabernet, Syrah, Tempranillo, Vijariego Negro
 White: Albillo, Bermejuela / Marmajuelo, Forastera Blanca, Doradilla, Gual, Malvasía Volcánica, Malvasía Aromática, Moscatel de Alejandría, Sabro, Verdello, Vijariego / Diego, Burrablanca, Breval, Listán Blanco, Pedro Ximénez, Bastardo Blanco, Torrontés

The vines were traditionally planted as low bushes (en vaso) though newly planted vineyards tend to be on trellises (en espaldera).

References

External links
 D.O.P. Valle de Güímar official website

Wine regions of Spain
Spanish wine
Appellations
Wine classification
Canary Islands cuisine
Tenerife